The Winnipeg Police Service is the police force of the city of Winnipeg, Manitoba, Canada.

History
When Winnipeg became a city, in 1873, an election was held to select the city's new mayor and aldermen. Those appointed decided to hire city officials, including a chief constable. On February 23, 1874, John S. Ingram was appointed the first Chief of Police of Winnipeg.

During the 1919 Winnipeg General Strike, most of the force was replaced with 2000 better-paid special constables, for refusing to sign a declaration promising to not belong to a union or participate in a sympathy strike, even though they remained on duty during the strike. The union was thus broken, and Chris H. Newton became the acting chief constable.

In 1972, Winnipeg merged with its eight neighbouring communities, causing their amalgamation, but still having eight police services with different uniforms and radio channels. The Royal Canadian Mounted Police (RCMP) contract for Charleswood and Headingley was cancelled, and that area fell under the inner city patrol area. On October 21, 1974, the amalgamation of the services was complete, and the remaining eight services formed into six districts. On January 1, 1975, all police officers in Winnipeg started to wear the same uniform with matching shoulder flashes that stated, "One, with the strength of many".

In the early 1990s, J.B. Dale Henry, a retired RCMP officer and former commander of the Manitoba "D" Division, was selected as the first chief of police not from the service's own ranks. Henry was well respected amongst minorities and sought to change and improve the image of police in Winnipeg. One of the most noticeable changes was the name for the police, from the "Winnipeg Police Force" (which it had been for 120 years), to the "Winnipeg Police Service". Another change was the addition of the motto "Community Commitment".

Henry also changed the department crest to the one known today and pictured above. The 13 golden stars on the badge represent the 13 communities that came together to form Winnipeg during the amalgamation in the 1970s, and the crocus is the provincial flower.

In 2003, city council approved a plan by the Winnipeg Police Service to go from six districts, to four. This plan involved three new police facilities. The new East District Station was completed in 2008, and the West District Station was completed in November 2013.

Administration
The Winnipeg Police Service  is headed by  Chief of Police Danny Smyth, appointed November 4, 2016, succeeding Chief Devon Clunis who retired July 9, 2016. The three deputy chiefs are Art Stannard, Scot Halley, and Gene Bowers. The service has 1,355 officers of which approximately half are on the front lines, known as "general patrol" (uniform operations). The WPS also has 562 civilian workers.

Operations 
The Winnipeg Police Service headquarters is located at 266 Graham Avenue, in the former Canada Post sortation facility, in the downtown area. The previous headquarters were the Public Safety Building, built in 1966, and is currently slated for demolition to make way for the Marketlands development.

Organization

The City of Winnipeg is divided into four policing districts: Downtown, West, North and East.  Each district contains several generalized and specialized police units.

Specialized units include:

Bicycle patrol 
Bomb disposal 
Canine 
Central traffic 
Crowd management
Photo enforcement 
Pawn 
River patrol 
Underwater search and recovery 
Victim services 
Street crime 
Tactical support team (TST) – formerly the part-time emergency response unit (ERU) made up of officers trained for special circumstances, such as hostage situations, armed and barricaded incidents and search warrants
Training  – includes, police vehicle operations instructors, policy and law instructors, firearms instructors, and use of force instructors – located at the WPS Training Academy
Division 40 – criminal investigation bureau – homicide, drugs, hate crimes, major crimes, morals, integrated proceeds of crime (IPOC), organized crime and Crime Stoppers
Division 41 – criminal investigation bureau – missing persons, child abuse, Internet child exploitation (ICE), domestic violence, high risk offenders, sex crimes, vulnerable persons, and youth crime
Division 42 – criminal investigation bureau – arson, commercial crime, stolen auto, pawn, surveillance and forensic services
Flight operations 
Auxiliary force cadet section

Fleet
Ford Police Interceptor Sedan (Majority of Fleet)
Ford Police Interceptor Utility
Chevrolet Tahoe Police Package
Terradyne Armored Vehicle Gurka
EC120 Colibri

Ranks and Insignia

Recruitment
Potential trainees must be at least eighteen years old with a high school diploma, and able to complete the Police Officer's Physical Aptitude Test (POPAT), which determines a recruit's physical ability. Training is salaried and takes 37 weeks consisting of classroom time, use of force and in the field training with assigned field training officers who supervise them while they carry out all regular duties. After this process is finished the recruit is inducted into the police service. After five years of general patrol service, officers may apply for specialty divisions like those listed above.

Winnipeg Police Museum
The Winnipeg Police Museum is a museum that displays the history of the Winnipeg Police Service from 1874 to the present. Pictures, equipment, vehicles and other artifacts are presented within the museum. An original 1911 jail cell from the North End Station is one of the highlights of the museum.  In June 2016, the museum moved to a new location inside police headquarters at 245 Smith Street.

Criticism 
The independent think tank Angus Reid found that Winnipeg residents have the second-highest ratio of unfavourable views of its police service of any major Canadian city.

Racism 
From the years 2000-2017, the Winnipeg Police killed 19 people; 11 of those 19 people killed were Indigenous. Mi’kmaq lawyer and professor Pam Palmater has said in response to this finding that “the statistics really confirm that there is a high level of police racism abuse and violence towards Indigenous peoples.” The count of the 19 people who Winnipeg Police killed does not include those who died in police custody, any incidents not disclosed to police oversight bodies, nor those who the police shot but who did not die. In the year 2019 alone, the Winnipeg Police killed seven people and filed 857 use-of-force reports, including 154 Taser deployments.

The group Justice 4 Black Lives Winnipeg launched a petition in 2020 that calls for defunding and abolishing the Winnipeg Police Service as its first demand. The petition states, “In Canada, the history of the police come from the racist colonial aftershocks used simply to control, manipulate and abuse Indigenous peoples in attempts to steal their land. We as Black people recognize and acknowledge that our current policing system is simply a reformed version of the racist and extremely violent slave patrol. No reform can come from these colonial practices, the system must be rebuilt and include marginalized voices in the process in order to protect all BIPOC to this city’s full capability.” Among other demands, the petition also calls for a complete ban on police officers’ use of knee-holds and chokeholds, transparency surrounding all police misconduct information and disciplinary histories, the immediate implementation of a Citizen’s Review Board, a zero-tolerance policy regarding police killings and the penalization and prosecution of police officers who kill Indigenous and Black people. The petition has collected over 120 700 signatures.

In 2022 and 2023, the Winnipeg Police Service faced widespread criticism for its refusal to search a city landfill for the remains of three Indigenous women who are believed to be the victims of an alleged serial killer. Community members, Indigenous leaders, victims’ family members, and family members of 2SMMIWG+ condemned the decision to not search the landfill sites during a press conference in Ottawa on December 8th, 2022. One of the demands arising from the press conference was that Danny Smyth resign from his position as chief of police. The Assembly of First Nations National Chief RoseAnne Archibald spoke about the Winnipeg Police Service’s refusal to search the site at the United Nations on International Women’s Day 2023, saying, “There can be no greater metaphor for how Indigenous women are treated and viewed in Canada than this particular case.” Despite the Winnipeg Police Service saying the search couldn't be done, advocacy efforts led to the creation of an Indigenous-led working group tasked with evaluating the feasibility of the search.

Budget 
The allocation of Winnipeg’s municipal budget towards the Winnipeg Police has drastically increased since the year 2000. While the Winnipeg Police consumed 17 percent of the City’s total operating budget in the year 2000, by 2020 this had risen to over 25% with a police budget of $304.1 million. This represents the highest proportion of funds that the City of Winnipeg gives towards any municipal department and “the highest proportion of spending by police of any major city in Canada.” In the same year, the City reduced funding for community groups, the maintenance of transit routes, and the Millennium Library. In 2023, the City’s budget for police increased to $327 million. This budget constitutes the same amount of “direct city funding as public transit, recreation, parks/trees, snow removal, libraries & arts/culture combined.”

Advocacy groups such as Winnipeg Police Cause Harm, Justice 4 Black Lives Winnipeg, Police-Free Schools Winnipeg, the Canadian Centre for Policy Alternatives, and the Police Accountability Coalition, which represents over 90 community-based organizations, have called for the funds allocated to the Winnipeg Police Services to be reallocated towards social services and infrastructure with proven records of improving people’s safety and well-being. A survey conducted by the Social Planning Council of Winnipeg found that Winnipeg residents are “three times as likely to favour spending more on poverty reduction than on investing in additional police services” in order to address crime.

Officer involved shootings
On March 9, 1988, Winnipeg Police constable Robert Cross attempted to detain John Joseph Harper, believing Harper was an auto theft suspect. According to Cross, Harper refused to provide identification, and was shot during a scuffle when he attempted to grab Cross's gun. Initially, the shooting was ruled as justified by the internal firearms board of enquiry. The shooting and other events led to the Aboriginal Justice Inquiry, a comprehensive investigation into the treatment of First Nations people within the Manitoba justice system. In 1991, the inquiry concluded that the WPS internal investigation was faulty and intended more to exonerate Cross than to discover the truth. The report recommended that officer-involved shootings be investigated by independent parties.

Recent cases 
On January 31, 2005, 18-year-old Matthew Dumas was armed with a screwdriver and was confronted by Constable Dennis Gbarek (a Metis officer). At the time, police were investigating a home invasion and Dumas was believed to be involved. The constable ordered Dumas to drop the screwdriver several times while Dumas responded by lunging at the constable and was shot. Dumas died from his injuries, It was later determined he was not involved in the home invasion. Two reviews of the shooting were performed by the Calgary Police Service in August 2006 and by the Ontario Crown Attorney's Office in May 2007 at the Manitoba government's request. Both reviews concluded the Winnipeg Police investigation of the shooting was handled properly. In June 2008, an inquest was held into Dumas's death. The inquest's report, released in December 2008, ruled that racism was not a factor in the incident.

In July, 17-year-old Michael Langan, a Métis, died after being tasered by police. Witnesses had reported a youth breaking into a vehicle, and police encountered Langan several blocks away, allegedly wielding a knife and refusing to surrender. David Chartrand, president of the Manitoba Metis Federation, suggested that racial profiling may have resulted in police using excessive force, an accusation that Police Chief Keith McCaskill denied. In August, Craig McDougall, a member of Wasagamack First Nation and nephew of John Joseph Harper, was tasered then shot by police responding to a disturbance call in the city's West End. Police reported that McDougall was brandishing a knife, though family members have disputed that claim, saying McDougall was carrying a cellular phone.

In 2020, 16-year-old Eishia Hudson was shot dead by Winnipeg Police after attempting to drive into police officers in a stolen Jeep.

Other incidents

In February 2005, a truck driven by off-duty WPS constable Derek Harvey-Zenk, reportedly drunk after having attended an all-night party, rear-ended and killed Crystal Taman, a 40-year-old woman, while she was stopped at a red light. The incident was initially investigated by East St. Paul Police. Harvey-Zenk was originally charged with "impaired driving causing death" and numerous other charges. In July 2007, however, Harvey-Zenk was pled down to "dangerous driving causing death" (a lesser charge) and given a conditional sentence of "two years less a day", to be served at his home.

Public outcry over the plea and allegations that the investigation had been botched led to a provincial inquiry, which began in June 2008. At the inquiry, multiple police officers testified that they did not notice Harvey-Zenk drinking, leading to allegations of a police cover-up. Furthermore, a waitress who served the officers liquor throughout the evening testified that she was pressured to not "remember too much" by the restaurant's manager, who was friends with the officers. Officers involved in the investigation have denied they gave preferential treatment to Harvey-Zenk.

Chiefs of Police

Chief Constables of the Winnipeg Police Force
 John S. Ingram 1874–1875  
 B. Murray 1875–1887 
 John C. McRae 1887–1911 
 Donald Macpherson 1911–1919 
 Christopher H. Newton 1919–1934 
 George Smith  1934–1947 
 Charles McIver 1947–1953  
 Robert T. Taft  1953-1965  
 George S. Blow  1965–1970  
 Norman M. Stewart 1970-1974

Chiefs of the Winnipeg Police Department
 Norman M. Stewart 1974-1981
 Kenneth Johnston 1981-1984
 Herb B. Stephen 1984-1991
 Dale Henry  1991-1995

Chiefs of the Winnipeg Police Service

 Dale Henry  1995-1996
 David A. Cassels 1996-1998
 Jack Ewatski 1998-2007
 Keith McCaskill 2007-2012
 Devon Clunis 2012-2016
 Danny Smyth 2016-

Source: Winnipeg Sun and WPS

See also
RCMP Heritage Centre, Regina, Saskatchewan 
Rotary Museum of Police and Corrections, Prince Albert, Saskatchewan 
Vancouver Police Centennial Museum

References

External links

 Winnipeg Police Service
 The Aboriginal Justice Implementation Commission
 Winnipeg Police Annual Reports

Law enforcement agencies of Manitoba
Municipal government of Winnipeg